The Vushtrri massacre was the mass killing of Kosovo Albanian refugees near Vushtrri, during the Kosovo War on 2–3 May 1999.

Background
A column of about 1,000 refugees were travelling in a convoy of about 100 tractors, who were fleeing fighting between the KLA and Serbian forces east of Vushtrri. Serbian Police and paramilitary forces caught up with the convoy that traveled south. On 2-3 May between Gornja Sudimlja and Donja Sudimlja near Vushtrri, an estimated one hundred men were killed.

ICTY investigator Romeu Ventura stated that 120 civilians were murdered on 2 May by Serb forces and buried two days later in a mass grave five miles east of Vushtrri. After the war, ICTY forensic teams discovered 98 bodies in Gornja Sudimlja.

The Vushtrri case was raised at the trial of Serbian police general Vlastimir Đorđević. The indictment against Đorđević says that some 105 Kosovo Albanians were killed in the massacre near the village of Sudimlje on 2 May 1999. Đorđević was sentenced to 27 years in prison.

References

See also
 Operation Horseshoe
 War crimes in the Kosovo War

Serbian war crimes in the Kosovo War
Massacres in 1999
Law enforcement in Serbia
Kosovan refugees
1999 in Kosovo
Massacres in the Kosovo War
May 1999 events in Europe
Anti-Albanian sentiment